First National Center is a high-rise office building located at 1620 Dodge Street in Downtown Omaha, Nebraska. It has 22 stories, making it one of the tallest buildings in the city of Omaha. The building is attached to a 19-story, 420-room Doubletree hotel and a 550-stall parking garage.

See also
Economy of Omaha, Nebraska
List of tallest buildings in Omaha, Nebraska
First National Bank of Omaha

References

Skyscraper office buildings in Omaha, Nebraska
Office buildings completed in 1971
1971 establishments in Nebraska

International style architecture in Nebraska
Bank buildings in Nebraska